The Snyder Buzzard was a light sport aircraft produced in the United States during the early 1930s.  The designer/builder was Bud Snyder.

Design and development
Designed to fill the lowest segment of the civil aviation market, the Buzzard was a single-seat single-engine fabric-covered aircraft of conventional configuration.

The wing was parasol-mounted.  The  ABC Scorpion  engine, mounted atop the wing, drove a pusher propeller

Specifications

See also

References

Aerofiles Buzzard entry
Aerofiles reference

Single-engined pusher aircraft
1930s United States sport aircraft
Parasol-wing aircraft
Aircraft first flown in 1930